The Raush River is a tributary of the Fraser River in British Columbia, Canada. The river joins the Fraser near the community of Dunster in the Robson Valley. The river's name is the result of a transcription error; it was originally called the Rivière au Shuswap, this was recorded on some maps as R.auSh., which then became Raush on official maps. Its source is the Raush Glacier, and major tributary creeks include Black Martin and Quanstrom.

More than 50 kilometers of the river are navigable, and are used by kayakers, canoeists, and jetboaters.

References

External links
 Satellite image of the Raush River

Rivers of British Columbia
Cariboo Mountains
Robson Valley
Tributaries of the Fraser River